The Shakhty constituency (No.154) is a Russian legislative constituency in Rostov Oblast. The constituency covers most of coal-mining Eastern Donbass.

Members elected

Election results

1993

|-
! colspan=2 style="background-color:#E9E9E9;text-align:left;vertical-align:top;" |Candidate
! style="background-color:#E9E9E9;text-align:left;vertical-align:top;" |Party
! style="background-color:#E9E9E9;text-align:right;" |Votes
! style="background-color:#E9E9E9;text-align:right;" |%
|-
|style="background-color:"|
|align=left|Ivan Bespalov
|align=left|Independent
|
|29.15%
|-
|style="background-color:"|
|align=left|Ruben Badalov
|align=left|Independent
| -
|27.60%
|-
| colspan="5" style="background-color:#E9E9E9;"|
|- style="font-weight:bold"
| colspan="3" style="text-align:left;" | Total
| 
| 100%
|-
| colspan="5" style="background-color:#E9E9E9;"|
|- style="font-weight:bold"
| colspan="4" |Source:
|
|}

1995

|-
! colspan=2 style="background-color:#E9E9E9;text-align:left;vertical-align:top;" |Candidate
! style="background-color:#E9E9E9;text-align:left;vertical-align:top;" |Party
! style="background-color:#E9E9E9;text-align:right;" |Votes
! style="background-color:#E9E9E9;text-align:right;" |%
|-
|style="background-color:"|
|align=left|Vladimir Katalnikov
|align=left|Independent
|
|32.64%
|-
|style="background-color:"|
|align=left|Vitaly Linnik
|align=left|Our Home – Russia
|
|15.77%
|-
|style="background-color:"|
|align=left|Ivan Bespalov (incumbent)
|align=left|Communist Party
|
|14.66%
|-
|style="background-color:"|
|align=left|Oleg Boyarkin
|align=left|Independent
|
|8.00%
|-
|style="background-color:#2C299A"|
|align=left|Vladimir Kalinko
|align=left|Congress of Russian Communities
|
|5.54%
|-
|style="background-color:"|
|align=left|Viktor Tkachev
|align=left|Liberal Democratic Party
|
|3.25%
|-
|style="background-color:#D50000"|
|align=left|Vyacheslav Gushchin
|align=left|Communists and Working Russia - for the Soviet Union
|
|2.53%
|-
|style="background-color:"|
|align=left|Sergey Shatsky
|align=left|Independent
|
|2.52%
|-
|style="background-color:"|
|align=left|Nikolay Shevchenko
|align=left|Independent
|
|2.21%
|-
|style="background-color:#2998D5"|
|align=left|Viktor Demyanchenko
|align=left|Russian All-People's Movement
|
|1.99%
|-
|style="background-color:"|
|align=left|Yevgeny Dulimov
|align=left|Education — Future of Russia
|
|1.94%
|-
|style="background-color:"|
|align=left|Aleksandr Aleksandrov
|align=left|Independent
|
|1.56%
|-
|style="background-color:#000000"|
|colspan=2 |against all
|
|5.13%
|-
| colspan="5" style="background-color:#E9E9E9;"|
|- style="font-weight:bold"
| colspan="3" style="text-align:left;" | Total
| 
| 100%
|-
| colspan="5" style="background-color:#E9E9E9;"|
|- style="font-weight:bold"
| colspan="4" |Source:
|
|}

1999

|-
! colspan=2 style="background-color:#E9E9E9;text-align:left;vertical-align:top;" |Candidate
! style="background-color:#E9E9E9;text-align:left;vertical-align:top;" |Party
! style="background-color:#E9E9E9;text-align:right;" |Votes
! style="background-color:#E9E9E9;text-align:right;" |%
|-
|style="background-color:"|
|align=left|Vladimir Katalnikov (incumbent)
|align=left|Independent
|
|36.61%
|-
|style="background-color:"|
|align=left|Mikhail Fetisov
|align=left|Independent
|
|22.00%
|-
|style="background-color:"|
|align=left|Vladimir Protsenko
|align=left|Communist Party
|
|16.56%
|-
|style="background-color:"|
|align=left|Sergey Khoroshilov
|align=left|Independent
|
|8.32%
|-
|style="background-color:"|
|align=left|Anatoly Sapronov
|align=left|Independent
|
|2.23%
|-
|style="background-color:"|
|align=left|Anatoly Osovsky
|align=left|Independent
|
|1.43%
|-
|style="background-color:#020266"|
|align=left|Aleksandr Yukhanayev
|align=left|Russian Socialist Party
|
|1.29%
|-
|style="background-color:"|
|align=left|Vladimir Sitnikov
|align=left|Independent
|
|0.91%
|-
|style="background-color:#000000"|
|colspan=2 |against all
|
|8.80%
|-
| colspan="5" style="background-color:#E9E9E9;"|
|- style="font-weight:bold"
| colspan="3" style="text-align:left;" | Total
| 
| 100%
|-
| colspan="5" style="background-color:#E9E9E9;"|
|- style="font-weight:bold"
| colspan="4" |Source:
|
|}

2003

|-
! colspan=2 style="background-color:#E9E9E9;text-align:left;vertical-align:top;" |Candidate
! style="background-color:#E9E9E9;text-align:left;vertical-align:top;" |Party
! style="background-color:#E9E9E9;text-align:right;" |Votes
! style="background-color:#E9E9E9;text-align:right;" |%
|-
|style="background-color:"|
|align=left|Vladimir Katalnikov (incumbent)
|align=left|Independent
|
|44.66%
|-
|style="background-color:"|
|align=left|Nikolay Kozitsyn
|align=left|Independent
|
|12.21%
|-
|style="background-color:"|
|align=left|Viktor Anpilov
|align=left|Independent
|
|9.85%
|-
|style="background-color:#C21022"|
|align=left|Vitaly Chernyshov
|align=left|Russian Pensioners' Party-Party of Social Justice
|
|7.77%
|-
|style="background-color:"|
|align=left|Igor Malikov
|align=left|Independent
|
|3.72%
|-
|style="background-color:#D50000"|
|align=left|Yury Udovichenko
|align=left|Russian Communist Workers Party-Russian Party of Communists
|
|3.40%
|-
|style="background-color:"|
|align=left|Dmitry Usoltsev
|align=left|Independent
|
|1.12%
|-
|style="background-color:#164C8C"|
|align=left|Vadim Petriyenko
|align=left|United Russian Party Rus'
|
|1.07%
|-
|style="background-color:#000000"|
|colspan=2 |against all
|
|14.13%
|-
| colspan="5" style="background-color:#E9E9E9;"|
|- style="font-weight:bold"
| colspan="3" style="text-align:left;" | Total
| 
| 100%
|-
| colspan="5" style="background-color:#E9E9E9;"|
|- style="font-weight:bold"
| colspan="4" |Source:
|
|}

2016

|-
! colspan=2 style="background-color:#E9E9E9;text-align:left;vertical-align:top;" |Candidate
! style="background-color:#E9E9E9;text-align:leftt;vertical-align:top;" |Party
! style="background-color:#E9E9E9;text-align:right;" |Votes
! style="background-color:#E9E9E9;text-align:right;" |%
|-
| style="background-color:"|
|align=left|Maksim Shchablykin
|align=left|United Russia
|
|61.92%
|-
|style="background-color:"|
|align=left|Gennady Shcherbakov
|align=left|Communist Party
|
|11.64%
|-
|style="background-color:"|
|align=left|Mikhail Sorokin
|align=left|Liberal Democratic Party
|
|10.66%
|-
| style="background-color: " |
|align=left|Nikolay Maslinnikov
|align=left|A Just Russia
|
|5.38%
|-
|style="background-color:"|
|align=left|Georgy Khugayev
|align=left|Communists of Russia
|
|2.60%
|-
|style="background-color:"|
|align=left|Aleksandr Tishchenko
|align=left|Rodina
|
|1.75%
|-
|style="background-color:"|
|align=left|Sergey Sarabyev
|align=left|Patriots of Russia
|
|1.36%
|-
|style="background-color:"|
|align=left|Alfred Minin
|align=left|The Greens
|
|1.06%
|-
|style="background-color:"|
|align=left|Sergey Anipko
|align=left|Civic Platform
|
|0.96%
|-
| colspan="5" style="background-color:#E9E9E9;"|
|- style="font-weight:bold"
| colspan="3" style="text-align:left;" | Total
| 
| 100%
|-
| colspan="5" style="background-color:#E9E9E9;"|
|- style="font-weight:bold"
| colspan="4" |Source:
|
|}

2021

|-
! colspan=2 style="background-color:#E9E9E9;text-align:left;vertical-align:top;" |Candidate
! style="background-color:#E9E9E9;text-align:left;vertical-align:top;" |Party
! style="background-color:#E9E9E9;text-align:right;" |Votes
! style="background-color:#E9E9E9;text-align:right;" |%
|-
| style="background-color:"|
|align=left|Yekaterina Stenyakina
|align=left|United Russia
|
|48.17%
|-
|style="background-color:"|
|align=left|Sergey Shapovalov
|align=left|Communist Party
|
|19.70%
|-
|style="background-color:"|
|align=left|Yury Mezinov
|align=left|A Just Russia — For Truth
|
|8.59%
|-
|style="background-color:"|
|align=left|Aleksandr Kuleshov
|align=left|New People
|
|5.15%
|-
|style="background-color: "|
|align=left|Konstantin Koshlyakov
|align=left|Party of Pensioners
|
|4.58%
|-
|style="background-color:"|
|align=left|Ilya Ptushkin
|align=left|Liberal Democratic Party
|
|4.55%
|-
|style="background-color: " |
|align=left|Vladimir Kalinin
|align=left|Yabloko
|
|3.45%
|-
|style="background-color: "|
|align=left|Vladimir Bashmakov
|align=left|Russian Party of Freedom and Justice
|
|3.34%
|-
| colspan="5" style="background-color:#E9E9E9;"|
|- style="font-weight:bold"
| colspan="3" style="text-align:left;" | Total
| 
| 100%
|-
| colspan="5" style="background-color:#E9E9E9;"|
|- style="font-weight:bold"
| colspan="4" |Source:
|
|}

Notes

References

Russian legislative constituencies
Politics of Rostov Oblast